The Spanish Horror Writers Association, Nocte, is a non-profit association whose objective is to promote horror literature written in Spanish by Spanish authors. Nocte aims at offering a meeting point for writers who tackle horror, dark fantasy or, as Harlan Ellison cleverly called it, “fiction of the macabre”. Among its activities, NOCTE helps horror writers to spread their works as far as possible, through the media and horror cons, and publishes anthologies of short stories written by its members.

NOCTE also wants to be a bridge for organizing writing workshops and meetings of horror-focused writers, to promote creative exchange among its members and find out and boost new talented horror writers.

See also 
 Nocte Awards

External links 
 Nocte's official web site

Horror fiction organizations
Spanish writers' organisations